The 1935 TCU Horned Frogs football team represented Texas Christian University (TCU) in the 1935 college football season. 

The Williamson System, recognized by the NCAA as a "major selector" of national championships, ranked TCU number one in its final post-bowl rankings.

TCU was led by second-year head coach Dutch Meyer. TCU and SMU again met to decide not only the SWC title but the first trip to the Rose Bowl for a team from the SWC. Grantland Rice of the New York Sun called it the "Game of the Century" and reported the following:
In a TCU Stadium that seated 30,000 spectators, over 36,000 wildly excited Texans and visitors from every corner of the map packed, jammed, and fought their way into every square foot of standing and seating space to see one of the greatest football games ever played…this tense, keyed up crowd even leaped the wire fences from the top of automobiles…"
SMU scored the first 14 points of the game. TCU, led by All-American quarterback Sammy Baugh, tied the game at the beginning of the fourth quarter. Then, with seven minutes left in the game SMU, on a 4th and 4 on the Frogs' 37 yard-line, lined up to punt. Quarterback Bob Finley threw a 50-yard pass to running back Bob Wilson who made what is described as a "jumping, twisting catch that swept him over the line for the touchdown." TCU would lose the game 20–14, but would be invited to play the LSU Tigers in the 1936 Sugar Bowl, where the Frogs would be victorious 3–2 at messy and muddy Tulane Stadium.

Even with the loss to SMU, who later lost to Stanford in the 1936 Rose Bowl,

After the bowls, TCU ended the season ranked number one in the Williamson System final rankings. However, the system's creator wrote "there was no undisputable national champion in 1935" in his column accompanying the final rankings. SMU finished second and LSU third in the final Williamson rankings. The NCAA records book erroneously credits TCU and LSU as Williamson System co-national champions for the season. Southern Methodist University and the University of Minnesota were selected as national champions by other selectors.

Schedule

References

TCU
TCU Horned Frogs football seasons
Sugar Bowl champion seasons
TCU Horned Frogs football